The 1939–40 Scottish Districts season is a record of all the rugby union matches for Scotland's district teams.

History

There was no Inter-City match this year due to the Second World War.

Permission was given for a South of Scotland District side to play a military XV in aid of the Red Cross. The match was scheduled for 4 November 1939.

East of Scotland District played a West of Scotland District side.

The Cities District versus Army XV match was organised in aid of the City of Glasgow Central War Relief Fund; and raised nearly £26,000.

Results

Inter-City

None.

Other Scottish matches

East of Scotland District:

West of Scotland District: 

Cities District: J. W. Adair (Heriot ' s F. P. ); D. H. J. Neil (Glasgow High School F. P.), J. G. S. Forrest (Cambridge University), H. Wylie (Watsonians), and G. II. Caithness (Edinburgh City Police ); D. Yellowlees (Outcasts ) and M. R. Dewar (Watsonians ); H. Thomson (Glascow Academicals), P. W. Tait (Hoyal High School F. P ) 1 ). W. Deas (Heriot ' s F. P.), J , D. Burnett (Kilmarnock ) J. C. llornel (Ardeer), J. H. Orr (Edinburgh City Police ) It. Mackay (Glasgow High School V. V.), and 1 !. J. L. Hammond (Royal Navy. ) 

Army Rugby Union: Pte. " J. Butler ; Pte. I. Shankland , 2 nd Lieut , ir. G. Uren. Pte. H. Carruthersand 2 nd Lieut. A. M. Stevenson ; Pte. A. L. Crozier and Lance-Corporal. 1. Hosarth ; Pte.. r. Hobson , Gunner W. C. Henderson Pte. W. Brunton 2 nd Lieut. R. II. Park , Lance-Corporal K. Cowe 2 nd Lieut ,. 1. N. Cadzow. 2 nd Lieut. P. L. Dull , and Sergeant-Major L. Denham

English matches

No other District matches played.

International matches

No touring matches this season.

References

1939–40 in Scottish rugby union
Scottish Districts seasons